James Moll is an American director and producer of film documentaries and television documentaries.  His documentary work has earned him an Academy Award, two Emmys, and a Grammy. Moll's production company, Allentown Productions Inc., has been based at Universal Studios since 1994, primarily producing non-fiction film and television projects. Moll also serves on the executive committee of the documentary branch of the Academy of Motion Picture Arts and Sciences, and serves as chair of the documentary award for the Directors Guild of America.

Early life and education
Moll was born in Allentown, Pennsylvania and attended and graduated from the USC School of Cinematic Arts in 1987.

Career

Film and television
Moll began his professional career as an intern reading scripts for film producer Lauren Shuler Donner, who later hired him as an assistant to French writer-director Francis Veber for Veber's American remake of "Les Fugitifs", Three Fugitives.

In 1996, Moll's first documentary as producer, Survivors of the Holocaust, received two Prime Time Emmy Awards and a third nomination.

In March 1999, James Moll received the Academy Award for Best Documentary Feature for directing The Last Days.   Steven Spielberg is executive producer of the film, which chronicles the lives of five Hungarian Jews during the Holocaust.

He directed and produced the feature-length documentary Price for Peace, which premiered prime time on NBC in 2002 and was hosted by Tom Brokaw; the late author Stephen Ambrose and Steven Spielberg are its executive producers. The film focuses on America's involvement in the Pacific Theater of Operations during World War II. It was produced in collaboration with DreamWorks and The National WWII Museum in New Orleans.

Moll directed and produced the 2007 feature length documentary Running the Sahara about three men who ran 4,300 miles across the Sahara desert from Senegal to Egypt. Matt Damon is executive producer of the film, which promotes Water.org, formerly the H2O Africa Foundation, co-founded by Damon to raise awareness of clean water initiatives in Africa.

In 2009, Moll was nominated for two Emmy Awards winning one of them, from the National Academy of Television Arts & Sciences for Inheritance. The film profiles Monika Göth Hertwig and her struggle dealing with her father's involvement in The Holocaust. Monika's father, S.S. Captain Amon Göth, who attained international notoriety after being portrayed by Ralph Fiennes in Schindler's List was executed for war crimes in 1946.

Moll directed the 2011 feature documentary Foo Fighters: Back and Forth, profiling rock band Foo Fighters' career. In 2012, Moll won a Grammy Award for "Best Music Video, Long Form" for the documentary.

Moll directed the 2017 documentary Obey Giant, which chronicles artist Shepard Fairey's personal story from his Charleston, South Carolina origins through his emergence as an iconoclastic brand. It also examines the relationship between street art, activism, punk rock, and politics. Producers of the film include actor James Franco.

In 2018, Moll completed his work on the Netflix television docuseries Medal of Honor in concert with executive producer Robert Zemeckis.  The documentary miniseries profiles the acts of heroism and selflessness exhibited by eight American soldiers who were awarded the Medal of Honor, the U.S. military's highest and most prestigious military honor for acts of valor.

Shoah Foundation 
Moll is founding executive director of the USC Shoah Foundation's Institute for Visual History and Education, also known as the Shoah Foundation. He established the non-profit organization with June Beallor in 1994 for Steven Spielberg. Moll and Beallor ran the day-to-day operations the Shoah Foundation from its inception in 1994 until 1998, and later worked with the foundation on the production of documentaries. Shoah Foundation's objective was collecting tens of thousands of videotaped testimonies from survivors of The Holocaust around the world; within five years, the foundation collected over 52,000 such testimonies in 32 languages.

Filmography

Notes

References

External links 
 
 Production Company Website

Living people
Artists from Allentown, Pennsylvania
Businesspeople from Allentown, Pennsylvania
American documentary film producers
Directors of Best Documentary Feature Academy Award winners
Film directors from Pennsylvania
Film producers from Pennsylvania
Grammy Award winners
Primetime Emmy Award winners
Peabody Award winners
USC School of Cinematic Arts alumni
Year of birth missing (living people)